Civic Center station, also known as Civic Center, is a station on the Metrorail rapid transit system in the Health District of Miami, Florida. The station is located at the intersection of Northwest 12th Avenue (State Road 933) and 15th Street. Civic Center provides a convenient connection for University of Miami medical students by connecting the hospital area to the main campus at University Station.

The station contains a branch of the Miami-Dade Public Library System.

The station opened for service on December 17, 1984.

Station layout
The station has two tracks served by side platforms. Entrances to the station are on either side of Northwest 12th Avenue, with fare control in a central mezzanine directly below the platform.

Places of interest
 Jackson Memorial Hospital
 University of Miami Miller School of Medicine
 Bascom Palmer Eye Institute
 Veterans Hospital
 LoanDepot Park (1 mile walk south)
 Miami-Dade County Jail
 Miami-Dade Justice Building/Courts
 Florida State Building
 Cedars Medical Center
 Miami-Dade County Health Department
 University of Miami Hospitals and Clinics

References

External links
 
 MDT – Metrorail Stations
 entrance from Google Maps Street View

Green Line (Metrorail)
Orange Line (Metrorail)
Metrorail (Miami-Dade County) stations in Miami
Railway stations in the United States opened in 1984
1984 establishments in Florida